Leptophobia forsteri is a butterfly in the  family Pieridae. It is found in Peru, Colombia and Venezuela.

References

Pierini
Butterflies described in 1969